The 2012–13 Uruguayan Segunda División is the season of second division professional of football in Uruguay. A total of 12 teams will compete; the champion team is promoted to the Uruguayan Segunda División.

Club information

Torneo Apertura

Standings

Results

Torneo Clausura

Standings

Results

Aggregate table

Standings

See also
2012–13 in Uruguayan football

2012–13 domestic association football leagues
3